Phi Tau Theta  was a national religious fraternity for Methodist men which through name changes and mergers became part of Sigma Theta Epsilon.

History
A group of Methodist men in the Wesley Foundation at the University of South Dakota had been carrying on a program as a religious fraternity called Phi Lambda Phi for some time, when it occurred to them that perhaps men in other Wesley Foundations had similar, fraternal-minded groups which could benefit from formation of a union, or national fraternity. This idea was brought up at a student council retreat held in Ames, Iowa, in 1924. In February of 1925, invitations were sent to all Wesley Foundation units asking those interested to send representatives to an organizational meeting. This meeting was held in Lincoln, Nebraska, on April 6 and 7, 1925, and was attended by members of Phi Lambda Phi of the University of South Dakota, the Wesley Guild of the University of Nebraska, the Young Men’s Club of the University of Minnesota, and Methodist men’s organizations of Iowa State College, the University of Oklahoma, and Pennsylvania State University. Articles of Federation were drawn up and submitted to the individual groups for ratification and national officers were elected, and thus a national religious fraternity for Methodist men to be known as Phi Tau Theta was born. 

The name Phi Tau Theta was derived from the Greek words for "Friends of God," Philos Tau Theos. The Methodist men’s groups from Iowa State (Alpha chapter), the University of Nebraska (Beta chapter), the University of South Dakota (Gamma chapter), and the University of Minnesota (Delta chapter) ratified the Articles of Federation and became the four charter chapters of Phi Tau Theta. The group from Pennsylvania State did not ratify the Articles and the group from the University of Oklahoma had previously withdrawn when it was proposed that a chapter of the fraternity should be organized for Methodist men of the Negro race. The Fraternity's first national Conclave was held at Iowa State College on December 19–21, 1925. The Conclave adopted a constitution, drafted rituals, and set up other machinery necessary for the proper functioning of a national fraternity. 	

The spirit of the group was expressed in the Preamble to the national constitution which was drafted by Lee Carpenter of the Nebraska chapter and W. Meyer of the South Dakota chapter and adopted by the first Conclave:
"Appreciating the need of a closer spiritual fellowship among men of Methodist preference in attendance at universities and colleges, and believing also that a fraternal organization of young men can do much to stimulate the development of high moral standards of college men and believing also that college and university men of Methodist preference, if so organized can have a more effective influence upon the student life, we hereby unite ourselves as Phi Tau Theta (Friends of God) a fraternity of Christian men for the promotion of these ideals." 

In line with this spirit and desire to "bring Methodist men into closer fellowship with each other and with the church, thus bringing them closer to God", five purposes of the fraternity were adopted:

1.	To create a more intimate spiritual fellowship among Methodist men and to organize our life around Jesus Christ as the Master of life.
2.	To develop leadership in the church, both as laymen and as professional workers.
3.	To promote the study of the Bible.
4.	To acquaint Methodist men with the history, activities, and purposes of the church.
5.	To promote clean social activities among its members.

Expansion
Phi Tau Theta began to grow and develop, with Epsilon chapter formed at the University of Iowa in October 1927. The Zeta chapter was installed at the University of California, Berkeley sometime in 1928. Over the next decade the fraternity added Eta chapter at Iowa State Teachers College (UNI), Theta chapter at Ohio University, Iota chapter at the University of Wyoming, Kappa chapter at Ohio State University, Lambda chapter at Kansas State University, Mu chapter at West Virginia University, and Nu chapter at Oklahoma Agricultural and Mechanical College (OU-Stillwater).

Merger
The fraternity merged with Sigma Epsilon Theta, another Methodist fraternity, in 1941, to form Delta Sigma Theta.  Due to the threat of a copyright lawsuit, Delta Sigma Theta would be renamed eight years later as Sigma Theta Epsilon, in 1949.

See also
Christian fraternity

External links
http://www.sigmatheta.org
https://web.archive.org/web/20050203203508/http://www.christianfraternity.org/

Christian fraternities and sororities in the United States
Student organizations established in 1925
1925 establishments in Nebraska